Eran Levi (born 4 August 1985) is an Israeli footballer who plays as a striker for Hapoel Ra'anana.

Career
Born in Or Akiva, Levi's professional career began with Maccabi Haifa, where he made his first-team debut in 2002, aged 17. He continued playing for Maccabi Haifa until the middle of 2004/05 season when he moved to Maccabi Tel Aviv for the rest of the season. In 2005, Levi played for Hapoel Kiryat Shmona, but he left in 2006 to play for Maccabi Netanya under the new management of Daniel Jammer and Eyal Berkovic.

Levi left Maccabi Netanya after having disciplinary issues with head coach Eli Guttman. Later that year, he transferred to Hapoel Akko from the Liga Haleumit and signed a 2-year contract with Hapoel Haifa a year later.

On June 26, 2013, Levi returned to Maccabi Netanya, signing a 3-year contract worth $370,000. His return also marked the first time in his career that he was appointed team captain. Levi was injured for the entire 2015–16 season as the club got relegated. On June 30, 2016, Levi signed a one-year contract for the 2016–17 season. Levi agreed to cut close to 70% from his salary in order to help the club get back on its feet. On July 29, 2018, Levi was released from his contract with Netanya after on going tension between him and the owner of the club. In 5 years with the club, Levi scored 55 goals and made 47 assists in a total of 142 games in all club competitions. Levi is placed at number 12th in the all time goalscorers of Maccabi Netanya.

In August 2018 Levi returned to Beitar Jerusalem and signed a one-year contract. After a poor half a season with Beitar in which he didn't get along with the manager, Levi moved to Hapoel Katamon Jerusalem on January 17, 2019.

On November 16, 2019 Levi joined Hapoel Umm al-Fahm, but left the club on December 27, 2019 and joined Hapoel Afula for the rest of the season.

On August 11, 2020 Levi joined Liga Alef side Hapoel Marmorek.

On July 5, 2021 Levi joined Maccabi Kabilio Jaffa, and took part in the team's promotion to the Liga Leumit at the end of the 2021/22 season. On June 1, 2022 he extended his contract for another year.

On October 3, 2022 Levi signed for Liga Alef side Hapoel Ra'anana.

Honours
Israeli Premier League
Winner (1): 2003–04
Toto Cup
Winner (1): 2002–03
Liga Leumit
Winner (3): 2008-09, 2013–14, 2016–17
Israel State Cup
Runner-up (1): 2014
Israeli Premier League Top Assist Provider (1): 2017-18

References

External links
 Profile at Hapoel Haifa
 Profile at Maccabi Haifa

1985 births
Living people
Israeli Jews
Israeli footballers
Israeli beach soccer players
Maccabi Haifa F.C. players
Maccabi Tel Aviv F.C. players
Hapoel Ironi Kiryat Shmona F.C. players
Maccabi Netanya F.C. players
Hapoel Haifa F.C. players
Hapoel Be'er Sheva F.C. players
Beitar Jerusalem F.C. players
Hapoel Katamon Jerusalem F.C. players
Hapoel Umm al-Fahm F.C. players
Hapoel Afula F.C. players
Hapoel Marmorek F.C. players
Maccabi Jaffa F.C. players
Israeli Premier League players
Liga Leumit players
Israel youth international footballers
Israel international footballers
People from Or Akiva
Association football forwards